Salvador Ichazo Fernández (born 26 January 1992) is a Uruguayan professional footballer who plays as a goalkeeper for Nacional.

Club career
Ichazo began his career with Danubio in 2006, playing for the various youth teams before his debut for the first team in 2012. In 2013, he won the Torneo Apertura and in 2014 he won the final of the Primera División, by saving three penalties in a row in the final against Montevideo Wanderers.

On 26 January 2015, he was officially loaned to Italian Serie A club Torino for six months with a buyout clause. After failing to transfer at the beginning of the transfer window, on 17 July 2015 Torino officially signed him outright.

On 31 August 2016, he was loaned to Serie B side Bari.

On 31 January 2017, he returned to Danubio on loan.

On 14 February 2020, Ichazo signed with Serie A club Genoa until 30 June 2020.

International career
In 2009, he played for the Uruguay under-17 at the 2009 FIFA U-17 World Cup in Nigeria, where he featured in four of the five matches disputed by the Celeste. In May 2011 he won the Suwon Cup with the Uruguay under-20.

Honours

Club
Danubio
Uruguayan Primera División: 2013–14

International 
Uruguay
Suwon Cup: 2011
South American U-20 Championship Runner-up: 2011

References

External links

Profile on goal.com

1992 births
Living people
Uruguayan people of Spanish descent
Uruguayan footballers
Uruguayan expatriate footballers
Uruguay youth international footballers
Uruguay under-20 international footballers
Association football goalkeepers
Uruguayan Primera División players
Serie A players
Danubio F.C. players
Club Atlético River Plate (Montevideo) players
Torino F.C. players
S.S.C. Bari players
Genoa C.F.C. players
Club Nacional de Football players
Uruguayan expatriate sportspeople in Italy
Expatriate footballers in Italy